In Greek mythology, Lycaon (/laɪˈkeɪɒn/; , Lukáо̄n) was a king of Arcadia who, in the most popular version of the myth, tested Zeus' omniscience by serving him the roasted flesh of Lycaon's own son Nyctimus, in order to see whether Zeus was truly all-knowing.

In return for these gruesome deeds, Zeus transformed Lycaon into a wolf and killed his offspring; Nyctimus was restored to life.

Despite being notorious for his horrific deeds, Lycaon was also remembered as a culture hero: he was believed to have founded the city Lycosura, to have established a cult of Zeus Lycaeus and to have started the tradition of the Lycaean Games, which Pausanias thinks were older than the Panathenaic Games. According to Gaius Julius Hyginus (d. AD 17), Lycaon dedicated the first temple to Hermes of Cyllene.

Family 
Lycaon was the son of Pelasgus and either the Oceanid Meliboea or Deianira, daughter of another Lycaon. His wife was called Cyllene, an Oread nymph who gave her name to Mount Cyllenê though sometimes she was regarded as his mother instead. In some accounts, the Arcadian town Nonakris was thought to have been named after his wife. Lycaon was also known to have had at least three daughters: Callisto, Dia and Psophis.

Sons of Lycaon
According to the Bibliotheca (Pseudo-Apollodorus), Lycaon has 50 sons. An alternate list of Lycaon's sons is given by Pausanias. According to his account, almost each of them founded a city in Arcadia and became its eponym.

Sources
There are several versions of the Lycaon myth already reported by Hesiod (Fragmenta astronomica, by Eratosthenes, Catasterismi), told by several authors. The most popular version is the one reported by Ovid in the first book of his Metamorphoses.

The different versions of the myth are as follows:

 According to the Bibliotheca, Lycaon had sired 50 sons with many wives. These sons were the most nefarious and carefree of all people. To test them Zeus visited them in the form of a peasant. They mixed the entrails of a child into the god's meal, whereupon the enraged Zeus threw the meal over the table, which explains the name of the city Trapezus (from τραπέζι "table"), and killed Lycaon and his sons with lightning. Only the youngest son, Nyctimus, was saved due to the intervention of Gaia.
 John Tzetzes records two similar versions which agree with Apollodorus' account; one mentions that the idea to serve Zeus a slaughtered child belonged to Maenalus, one of Lycaon's sons, while the other makes Nyctimus the victim.
 According to Pausanias, Lycaon was instantly transformed into a wolf after sacrificing a child on the altar of Zeus and sprinkling the blood on the altar.
 According to Lycophron, all were transformed into wolves for having devoured Nyctimus. Lycophron extends the characteristics of Lycaon and his sons onto all the Arcadians.
 The version recounted by Hyginus in his Fabulae is basically the same as that of Pseudo-Apollodorus. In Astronomica, Hyginus describes the victim of Lycaon as being Arcas, son of Jupiter (Zeus) and Callisto, the daughter of Lycaon. When saved and restored to life, Arcas was brought up to be a hunter. By mistake, he hunted himself and his mother (for the moment transformed into a bear) into a temple where entrance was punished by death. Both were saved by Zeus to constitute the constellations Arctophylax and Ursa Major, the Great Bear.
 Nicolaus Damascenus tells that Lycaon's sons were nefarious. To test Zeus they mixed the flesh of a boy into the sacrifices, whereupon all who were present during the murder of the child were killed by lightning.
 According to Ovid, Lycaon mistrusted and derided the signs of Zeus' divine nature which the god openly demonstrated upon arrival to Arcadia. Determined to find out whether the guest was truly a god or a mortal, Lycaon served Zeus the flesh of a prisoner, partly cooked and partly roasted. Moreover, in his quest to test Zeus' immortality Lycaon attempted to murder the god while he slept. Thereupon Zeus brought the roof down and transformed the fleeing Lycaon into a wolf.
 According to the dictionary Suda, Lycaon had diligently been guarding the laws established by his father for the Arcadian people. In order to keep his subjects from injustice, he would tell them that Zeus frequented his home in the guise of a mortal man so as to keep watch over how lawful the humans were. One day when he was about to perform a sacrifice, the people were eager to know if the god was present; to find out if Lycaon told them the truth about Zeus' visits, they killed one of the king's fifty sons and mixed him in with the sacrificial meat, whereupon all of them were killed by lightning.
 According to Eratosthenes, Lycaon butchered his grandson (that is, Arcas), who was put together again by Zeus and placed upon the constellations, whereas Lycaon's house was struck by a thunderbolt.

Modern interpretation 
The English poet Robert Graves, in his The Greek Myths, explained the origin of Lycaon's myth as follows:

 "The story of Zeus and the boy's guts is not so much a myth as a moral anecdote expressing the disgust felt in more civilized parts of Greece for the ancient cannibalistic practices of Arcadia, which were still performed in the name of Zeus, as "barbarous and unnatural" (Plutarch: Life of Pelopidas). Lycaon's virtuous Athenian contemporary Cecrops, offered only barley—cakes, abstaining even from animal sacrifices. The Lycaonian rites, which the author denies that Zeus ever countenanced, were apparently intended to discourage the wolves from preying on flocks and herds, by sending them a human king. "Lycaeus" means "of the she-wolf", but also "of the light", and the lightning in the Lycaon myth shows that Arcadian Zeus began as a rain-making sacred king—in service to the divine She-wolf, the Moon, to whom the wolfpack howls. A Great Year of one hundred months, or eight solar years, was divided equally between the sacred king and his tanist; and Lycaon's fifty sons—one for every month of the sacred king's reign—will have been the eaters of the umble soup. The figure twenty-two, unless it has been arrived at by a count of the families who claimed descent from Lycaon and had to participate in the umble-feast, probably refers to the twenty-two five-year lustra which composed a cycle—the 110-year cycle constituting the reign of a particular line of priestesses."

See also
Damarchus
Lykaia
Werewolf (lycanthropy)
Tantalus

Notes

References
 Apollodorus, The Library with an English Translation by Sir James George Frazer, F.B.A., F.R.S. in 2 Volumes, Cambridge, MA, Harvard University Press; London, William Heinemann Ltd. 1921. ISBN 0-674-99135-4. Online version at the Perseus Digital Library. Greek text available from the same website.
 Dionysus of Halicarnassus, Roman Antiquities. English translation by Earnest Cary in the Loeb Classical Library, 7 volumes. Harvard University Press, 1937-1950. Online version at Bill Thayer's Web Site
 Dionysius of Halicarnassus, Antiquitatum Romanarum quae supersunt, Vol I-IV. . Karl Jacoby. In Aedibus B.G. Teubneri. Leipzig. 1885. Greek text available at the Perseus Digital Library.
 Fowler, Robert L., Early Greek Mythography. Volume 2: Commentary. Oxford University Press. Great Clarendon Street, Oxford, OX2 6DP, United Kingdom. 2013. 
Gaius Julius Hyginus, Astronomica from The Myths of Hyginus translated and edited by Mary Grant. University of Kansas Publications in Humanistic Studies. Online version at the Topos Text Project.
 Gaius Julius Hyginus, Fabulae from The Myths of Hyginus translated and edited by Mary Grant. University of Kansas Publications in Humanistic Studies. Online version at the Topos Text Project.
 Graves, Robert, The Greek Myths, Harmondsworth, London, England, Penguin Books, 1960. 
 Lucius Mestrius Plutarchus, Moralia with an English Translation by Frank Cole Babbitt. Cambridge, MA. Harvard University Press. London. William Heinemann Ltd. 1936. Online version at the Perseus Digital Library. Greek text available from the same website.
 Lycophron, The Alexandra  translated by Alexander William Mair. Loeb Classical Library Volume 129. London: William Heinemann, 1921. Online version at the Topos Text Project.
 Lycophron, Alexandra translated by A.W. Mair. London: William Heinemann; New York: G.P. Putnam's Sons. 1921. Greek text available at the Perseus Digital Library.
 Pausanias, Description of Greece with an English Translation by W.H.S. Jones, Litt.D., and H.A. Ormerod, M.A., in 4 Volumes. Cambridge, MA, Harvard University Press; London, William Heinemann Ltd. 1918. . Online version at the Perseus Digital Library

 Pausanias, Graeciae Descriptio. 3 vols. Leipzig, Teubner. 1903.  Greek text available at the Perseus Digital Library.
 Publius Ovidius Naso, Metamorphoses translated by Brookes More (1859-1942). Boston, Cornhill Publishing Co. 1922. Online version at the Perseus Digital Library.
 Publius Ovidius Naso, Metamorphoses. Hugo Magnus. Gotha (Germany). Friedr. Andr. Perthes. 1892. Latin text available at the Perseus Digital Library.
 Stephanus of Byzantium, Stephani Byzantii Ethnicorum quae supersunt, edited by August Meineike (1790-1870), published 1849. A few entries from this important ancient handbook of place names have been translated by Brady Kiesling. Online version at the Topos Text Project.
 Suida, Suda Encyclopedia translated by Ross Scaife, David Whitehead, William Hutton, Catharine Roth, Jennifer Benedict, Gregory Hays, Malcolm Heath Sean M. Redmond, Nicholas Fincher, Patrick Rourke, Elizabeth Vandiver, Raphael Finkel, Frederick Williams, Carl Widstrand, Robert Dyer, Joseph L. Rife, Oliver Phillips and many others. Online version at the Topos Text Project.

External links 
 

Werewolves in Greek Myths
Autochthons of classical mythology
Mythological kings of Arcadia
Kings in Greek mythology
Metamorphoses characters
Deeds of Zeus
Human sacrifice